Phlox is a genus of flowering plants. 

The term may also refer to:

 , a Union gunboat during the American Civil War
 Phlox (Star Trek), a fictional character
 Phlox, Indiana, an unincorporated place in the United States
 Phlox, Wisconsin, an unincorporated place in the United States